Clément Morel (born 16 July 1984) is a French former professional tennis player.

Career
Morel was the junior champion at the 2002 Australian Open. He defeated countryman Jo-Wilfried Tsonga in the semi-finals, then won the title with a win over Todd Reid in the final. In the juniors event at the 2002 Wimbledon Championships, Morel lost in the second round to Ryan Henry, with a final set scoreline of 24–26, which was a tournament record.

He took part in qualifying for the 2004 French Open and also appeared in an ATP Challenger tournament in Grenoble that year, but otherwise played on the Futures circuit. His two Futures titles came in South Africa in 2006 and the other a 2008 tournament in Belgium.

In 2008 he switched nationalities and began representing the Monaco Davis Cup team. He played two matches, the first was a win over Algerian Slimane Saoudi in 2008 and the other a loss to Finland's Henri Laaksonen the following year.

Clément Morel continued his studies at EM Lyon Business School

Junior Grand Slam finals

Singles: 1 (1 title)

ATP Challenger and ITF Futures finals

Singles: 8 (2–6)

Doubles: 11 (5–6)

References

External links
 
 
 

1984 births
Living people
Emlyon Business School alumni
French male tennis players
Monegasque male tennis players
Australian Open (tennis) junior champions
Grand Slam (tennis) champions in boys' singles
People from Oullins
Sportspeople from Lyon Metropolis